Kintaro Miyagi (born April 14, 1998) is a Filipino footballer for Philippines Football League club Cebu. He has played for the Philippines national football team.

Amateur career

Youth
While attending Sacred Heart School-Ateneo de Cebu, Miyagi played for the Magis Eagles his school's varsity team which he helped win various titles. He was also represented Mandaue in local inter-city tournaments as well as Central Visayas in regional meets such as the Palarong Pambansa.

Collegiate career
He decided to move to Metro Manila from Cebu after he graduated from high school to study at the University of the Philippines Diliman to take up a bachelor's degree in Physical Education. The university's football head coach, Anto Gonzales offered him a scholarship to study at the school so he could become part of UP's football team. Miyagi helped lead the Maroons to two UAAP Football Championship titles in Seasons 78 and 80, as well as four Philippine University Games (Unigames) championships, before deciding to forgo his final collegiate playing year to pursue a football career professionally.

Professional career
Miyagi was signed by his hometown Philippines Football League club Cebu F.C., who are to make their debut in 2021.

International
Miyagi became part of the youth program of the Philippine national team in 2011. He was part of the country's U13/U14 squad representing the country in youth tournaments. He played as a defender as a national youth player. As part of the U15 team which was coached by Anto Gonzales, he played at the 2013 Football Association of Malaysia (FAM)-Frenz U-15 ASEAN Champions Trophy. In 2016, he was part of the U19 squad coached by Dan Padernal for the 2016 AFC U-19 Championship qualifiers.

His first call up to the senior national team was in 2017. He was part of a squad which participated at the 2017 CTFA International Tournament, a friendly tournament in Taiwan. The national team is led by Marlon Maro in lieu of regular coach, Thomas Dooley since the national federation was supposed to send an under-23 team which Maro coaches.

Miyagi earned his first cap in the 3–1 win against Laos on December 1, 2017. He came in as a substitute for Phil Younghusband in the 70th minute. Playing for the senior team as a striker, Miyagi scored the third goal for the Philippines in the 81st minute.

References

Filipino people of Japanese descent
University of the Philippines alumni
University Athletic Association of the Philippines footballers
Filipino footballers
Philippines international footballers
1998 births
Living people
Association football forwards
Cebu F.C. players